Andrejs Apsītis (7 February 1888 – 2 September 1945) was a Latvian cyclist. He competed for the Russian Empire at the 1912 Summer Olympics and for Latvia at the 1924 Summer Olympics.

At the 1912 Olympic games in Stockholm, he finished the 320 kilometers race for road bicycle racing, earning 60th place with a time of 12.18:20,6. At the 1924 Olympic games in Paris, Apsitis with other Latvian cyclists team shared 7th to 10th place in the 4000 meters sprint.

He participated at the World championship, where he withdrew from the race. He won multiple times in the Latvian championship and in all-Union (USSR) sport games.

Apsītis participated in competitions with G. Ērenpreis Bicycle Factory manufactured sports bicycles.

References

External links
 

1888 births
1945 deaths
People from Ogre Municipality
People from Kreis Riga
Male cyclists from the Russian Empire
Latvian male cyclists
Olympic cyclists of Latvia
Olympic competitors for the Russian Empire
Cyclists at the 1912 Summer Olympics
Cyclists at the 1924 Summer Olympics